Lipographis umbrella is a species of snout moth in the genus Lipographis. It was described by Harrison Gray Dyar Jr. in 1908, and is known from the US state of California.

References

Moths described in 1908
Phycitinae